Luis is a given name. Other Iberian Romance languages have comparable forms:  (with an accent mark on the i) in Portuguese and Galician,  in Aragonese and Catalan, while  is archaic in Portugal, but common in Brazil.

Origins 
The Germanic name  (and its variants) is usually said to be composed of the words for "fame" and "warrior" and hence may be translated to famous warrior or "famous in battle".

Modern forms of the name are the German name Ludwig and the Dutch form Lodewijk.  and the other Iberian forms more closely resemble the French name Louis, a derivation of the Latinized form Clovis, known from the kings of the Franks. The sanctified French king Louis IX (Saint Louis) contributed much to the popularity of the name.

Given name

Royalty of Portugal
 Luís I of Portugal (1838–1889), Portuguese king
 Infante Luís (1340-1340), first son of King Pedro I of Portugal
 Prince Luís, Duke of Beja (1506–1555)
 Luís Filipe, Prince Royal of Portugal (1887–1908)

Sports
 Luis Alberto González, Colombian cyclist (1965)
 Luis Alberto Pérez, Nicaraguan boxer (1978)
 Luis Alberto Pérez-Rionda, Cuban runner (1969)
 Luis Amaranto Perea, Colombian football player (1979)
 Luis Antonio Jiménez, Chilean footballer (1984)
 Luis Aragonés, Spanish football player and manager (1938-2014)
 Luis Arráez, Venezuelan baseball player (1997)
 Luis Alberto Ayala, Chilean tennis player (1932)
 Luis Ignacio Ayala, Mexican baseball pitcher (1978)
 Luis Barrera, Dominican baseball player (1995)
 Luis Barrios, Peruvian basketball player (1990)
 Luis Caballero, Paraguayan footballer (1962-2005)
 Luis Campusano, American baseball player (1998)
 Lluís Carreras, Spanish footballer (1972)
 Luis Antonio Castillo, Dominican baseball player (1975)
 Luis Alberto Castillo, Dominican-American football player (1983)
 Luis Felipe Castillo, Dominican baseball player (1995)
 Luis Miguel Castillo, Dominican baseball player (1992)
 Luis Cessa, Mexican baseball player (1992)
 Luis Cristaldo, Bolivian footballer
 Luis Díaz, Venezuelan volleyball player
 Luís Dutra Jr., Brazilian mixed martial arts fighter
 Luis Enrique, Spanish football player and manager
 Luis Ernesto José, Dominican boxer
 Luis Ernesto Michel, Mexican football goalkeeper
 Luís Fabiano, Brazilian football player
 Luis Fernando Suárez, Colombian football player and manager
 Luís Figo, Portuguese football player
 Luis Frías, Dominican baseball player
 Luis Amado García, Dominican baseball player (1987)
 Luis Heibardo García, Venezuelan baseball player (1996)
 Luis Victoriano García, Dominican-American baseball player (2000)
 Luis García Sanz, Spanish football player
 Luis Galván, Argentine football player
 Luis Ángel Gil, Dominican baseball player
 Luis Miguel Gil, American soccer player
 Luis Emilio Gonzalez, Cuban-American baseball player
 Luis Fernando González, Mexican baseball player
 Luis Guillorme, Venezuelan baseball player
 Luis Liberato, Dominican baseball player
 Luis Manuel Rodríguez, Cuban boxer
 Luis Marín, Costa Rican football player
 Luís Martins, Portuguese football player
 Luis Ángel Medina, Dominican baseball player
 Luis Main Medina, American baseball player
 Luis Monti, Italian and Argentine football player and manager
 Luís Novo, Portuguese long-distance runner
 Luis Olmo, Puerto Rican baseball player
 Luis Onmura, Brazilian judoka
 Luis Alberto Ortiz, Dominican baseball player and coach
 Luis Francisco Ortiz, American baseball player
 Luis Leandro Ortiz, Dominican baseball player
 Luis Ortiz Flores, Puerto Rican boxer
 Luis Palau, Argentine-American televangelist
 Luis Palomino, Peruvian mixed martial arts fighter
 Luis Patiño, Colombian baseball player
 Luis Patiño (tennis), Mexican tennis player
 Luis David Perdomo, Dominican baseball player
 Luis M. Perdomo, Dominican baseball player
 Luis Perez, American football player
 Luis Pizarro, Puerto Rican boxer
 Luis Rengifo, Venezuelan baseball player
 Luis Rivera (infielder), Puerto Rican baseball player and coach
 Luis Robert, Cuban baseball player
 Luis Orlando Rodríguez, Venezuelan baseball player
 Luis Rodríguez, Puerto Rican volleyball player Luis Rodríguez
 Luis Rojas (baseball), Dominican baseball player and coach
 Luis Salvadores Salvi, Chilean basketball player
 Luis Salom, (1991 – 2016)Spanish Grand prix motorcycle racer
 Luis Santos (baseball), Dominican baseball pitcher
 Luís Santos (water polo), Brazilian water polo goalkeeper
 Luis Severino, Dominican baseball player
 Luis Soares, Portuguese-French long-distance runner
 Luis Somoza Debayle, former president of Nicaragua
 Luis Suárez, Uruguayan footballer (1987)
 Luis Suárez Miramontes, Spanish football player and manager
 Luis Terrero, Dominican baseball player
 Luis Tiant, Cuban-American baseball player
 Luis Torrens, Venezuelan baseball player
 Luis Urías, Mexican baseball player
 Luis Urueta, Colombian baseball coach
 Luis Vasquez, American football player
 Luis Villar, Argentine basketball player
 Luis Villarroel, Venezuelan diver
 Luis Vizcaíno, Dominican baseball player

Arts and entertainment
 Luis Antonio Ramos, Puerto Rican actor
 Luis Antonio Rivera, Puerto Rican television host
 Luis Buñuel, Spanish film director
 Lluís Claret, Andorran cellist
 Luis Enrique, Nicaraguan singer
 Luis Fernando Vager, Puerto Rican musician and producer
 Luis Fonsi, Puerto Rican singer
 Luis Gatica, Mexican-Chilean-Puerto Rican actor and singer
 Luis Guzmán, Puerto Rican actor
 Luis Roberto Guzmán, Puerto Rican actor
 Lluís Llach, Catalan composer
 Luis Manzano, Filipino actor and television host
 Luis Egidio Meléndez, Spanish painter
 Luis Miguel, Mexican singer
 Luis Oquendo, Cuban actor
 Luis "Perico" Ortiz, Puerto Rican musician
 Luis Rego, Portuguese actor and musician
 Luis Segura, Dominican singer
 Luis Vargas, Dominican singer
 Luis Vigoreaux Lorenzana, Puerto Rican television host
 Luis Vigoreaux Rivera, Puerto Rican television host
 Luis Ferdinand Vega, known as Little Louie Vega, American DJ, record producer and Grammy Award winner remixer of Puerto Rican ancestry

Politicians
 Luis Alberto de Herrera, Uruguayan politician
 Luis Alberto Ferré Aguayo, former Governor of Puerto Rico (1969–1973)
 Luis Arce, Bolivian politician and current president of Bolivia
 Luis Alberto Lacalle, former president of Uruguay
 Luis Ángel González Macchi, former president of Paraguay
 Lluís Companys i Jover, Catalan politician
 Luis Conrado Batlle y Berres, former president of Uruguay
 Luis María del Corazón de Jesús Dionisio Argaña Ferraro, Paraguayan politician
 Luis R. Esteves, Major General, Puerto Rican-American military leader
 Luis Fortuño, Governor of Puerto Rico (2009–present)
 Luis Gutiérrez, Puerto Rican-American political leader
 Luis Mangalus Taruc, Filipino politician
 Luis Mena, President of Nicaragua
 Luis Muñoz Marín, first democratically elected governor of Puerto Rico
 Luis Enrique Oberto (1928–2022), Venezuelan politician
 Luis Redondo, Honduran politician and engineer, deputy and president of the National Congress of Honduras
 Luis Muñoz Rivera, Puerto Rican politician and father of Luis Muñoz Marín
 Luis Rodríguez de Miguel (1910–1982), Spanish politician and jurist

Writer
 Luís de Camões, Portuguese poet
 Luis Lloréns Torres, Puerto Rican playwright and poet
 Luis López Nieves, Puerto Rican writer
 Luis Palés Matos, Puerto Rican author

Other
 Luis F. Alvarez, Spanish-American physician (grandfather of Luis W. Alvarez)
 Luis W. Álvarez, Spanish-American physicist, winner of the 1968 Nobel Prize in Physics
 Luis Aponte Martínez, Puerto Rican religious leader
 Luis E. Arreaga, Guatemalan-American diplomat
 Luis Carrillo, Spanish colonial administrator
 Luis de Moscoso Alvarado, Spanish explorer and conquistador
 Lluís Domènech i Montaner, Catalan architect
 Luis Motta Domínguez, Venezuelan politician and military officer
 Luis Enríquez de Guzmán, 9th Count of Alba de Liste, Spanish nobleman
 Luis Jacob, Peruvian-Canadian visual artists and photographer
 Luis Garavito, prolific Colombian serial killer and rapist
 Luis Muñoz de Guzmán, a Spanish colonial administrator
 Luis González Vale, Puerto Rican historian
 Luis Guinot, Puerto Rican-American diplomat
 Luis Lliboutry, French-Chilean glaciologist
 Luis Lopez-Fitzgerald, fictional character on NBC's daytime drama Passions
 Luis Marden, American photographer
 Luis Marileo Colipí, Mapuche chief
 Luis Miranda Casañas, Puerto Rican businessman
 Luis M. Rocha, American-Portuguese professor and scientist
 Luis Née, explorer, botanist, discovered Coast Live Oak in California
 Luis Ortega Álvarez, Spanish judge
 Luis Padial, Puerto Rican military leader
 Luis Posada Carriles, Cuban militant
 Luis Rafael Sánchez, Puerto Rican playwright
 Luis Sera, a character in Resident Evil 4
 Luis Scott-Vargas, American Magic: the Gathering player
 Luis Antonio Tagle, Filipino cardinal and current prefect of the Congregation for the Evangelization of Peoples

 Middle name
 José Luis Corcuera (born 1944), Spanish politician

See also
 
 
 
 
 
 
 
 
 Lewis (given name)
 Louis (given name)
 Lucho
 Luiz (given name)

References

Luis is rooted from Armenian Luis - Լոյս meaning light.

Spanish masculine given names
Portuguese masculine given names